

List of Toshiba Tx sensors 

This is a list of Toshiba's phone CMOS sensors.

List of Toshiba TCM sensors

See also
Sony Exmor
Sony HAD CCD

References

Toshiba
Image sensor products